The PowerEdge (PE) line is Dell's server computer product line.

Most PowerEdge servers use the x86 architecture. The early exceptions to this, the PowerEdge 3250, PowerEdge 7150, and PowerEdge 7250, used Intel's Itanium processor, but Dell abandoned Itanium in 2005 after failing to find adoption in the marketplace. The partnership between Intel and Dell remained close, with Intel remaining the exclusive source of processors in Dell's servers until 2006. In May 2006 Dell announced that it also intended to develop servers using AMD Opteron processors.
The first Opteron-based PowerEdge systems, the PowerEdge 6950 and the PowerEdge SC1435, appeared in October 2006.

PowerEdge machines come configured as tower, rack-mounted, or blade servers. Dell uses a consistent chip-set across servers in the same generation regardless of packaging, allowing for a common set of drivers and system-images.

Original equipment manufacturers (OEMs) and value-added resellers also offer solutions based on PowerEdge servers. Loaded with custom software and with minor cosmetic changes, Dell's servers form the underlying hardware in certain appliances from IronPort,
Google,
Exinda Networks, and Enterasys.

In 2007 the PowerEdge line accounted for approximately 15% of Dell's overall revenue from computer-hardware sales. In subsequent years Dell made the transition from a pure hardware vendor to a solutions-provider and services company, as evidenced, for example, by the acquisition of Perot Systems and KACE Networks and the setup of a special global services department within Dell.

PowerEdge RAID Controller

Dell uses the name PowerEdge RAID Controller (PERC) for proprietary versions of its RAID computer storage controllers. The related software in the PERC Fault Management Suite offered facilities such as the Background Patrol read, which aims to fix bad sectors on online RAID disks running under some of the PERC controllers around 2006.
These  cards were equipped with hardware from LSI Corporation  or Intel, 256 MBytes of memory (upgradeable on the 5/i to 512 MB), support up to 8x SATA 3.0 Gbit/s drives without the use of expanders. They had an optional Battery Backup Unit (BBU) to allow more flexible use of the memory during writes, enhancing performance in RAID5 and 6, and operate over the PCI Express interface.

Chassis systems
Although PowerEdge is mainly used to refer to servers there are a few systems where the term PowerEdge refers to systems of which servers are (just) a part. Examples of these usages are:
PowerEdge M1000e - the Dell blade-server system where the complete system uses the term PowerEdge, and M1000e refers to the chassis and the complete combination of components in them. The individual non-server components have also their own name in their 'own' family such as PowerConnect M-switches or EqualLogic blade-SAN.
PowerEdge VRTX - the converged system consisting of (up to) 4 PowerEdge M-blade servers, the built-in storage solution and the I/O networking module.

Model naming convention
Since the introduction of the generation 10 servers in 2007 Dell adopted a standardized method for naming their servers; the name of each server is represented by a letter followed by 3 digits. The letter indicates the type of server: R (for Rack-mountable) indicates a 19" rack-mountable server, M (for Modular) indicates a blade server, while T (for Tower) indicates a stand-alone server.

This letter is then followed by 3 digits:
 The first digit refers to the number of CPU sockets in the system: 1 to 3 for one socket, 4 to 7 for two sockets, and 9 for four sockets.  8 can be either two or four sockets depending on generation and CPU maker 
 The second digit refers to the generation: 0 for Generation 10, 1 for Generation 11, and so on.
 The third digit indicates the maker of the CPU: 0 for Intel or 5 for Advanced Micro Devices (AMD).
For example: The Dell PowerEdge M610 was a two-socket server of the 11th generation using an Intel CPU while the R605 was a two-socket AMD-based rack-server of the 10th generation.

Prior to the Generation 10 servers, the naming convention was as follows:
 First digit – Height of the server in rack units
 Second digit – Generation of server (up to 9th generation)
 Third digit – Server type (5 for rack server, 0 for tower server, although tower servers could be outfitted with a rack chassis)
 Fourth digit – Indicated whether blade or independent box (5 for blade, 0 for normal independent box)

Example 1: PowerEdge 2650 (
2 = 2U server,
6 = 6th generation,
5 = rack server,
0 = normal )

Example 2: PowerEdge 6950 (
6 = 4U server, 
9 = 9th generation, 
5 = rack server, 
0 = normal )

Example 3: PowerEdge 2800 (
2 = [based on] 2U server 2850, 
8 = 8th generation, 
0 = tower server, 
0 = normal )

Example 4: PowerEdge 1855 (
1 = 1U server, 
8 = 8th generation, 
5 = rack server, 
5 = blade )

Most servers had a tower equivalent. For example, the PowerEdge 2800 was the tower equivalent of the 2850. The naming applies to the tower version too, but the tower version will usually be between 5U and 6U.

See also
List of Dell PowerEdge Servers

References

External links

 Dell Server Documentation
 Using a PowerEdge tower on its side in a rack
 Review Dell PowerEdge R810
 Review Dell PowerEdge R815

PowerEdge
Server hardware
PowerEdge